The St. Louis Flyers were a minor league ice hockey team, based in St. Louis, Missouri, playing home games at the St. Louis Arena in the Cheltenham, St. Louis neighborhood, across from Forest Park.

The Flyers played fourteen seasons in the American Hockey Association from 1928 to 1942, and played nine seasons in the American Hockey League from 1944–45 and 1952–53.  This was St. Louis' first and only AHL team.

Season-by-season results
 1928–1942 (American Hockey Association)
 1944–1953 (American Hockey League)

Regular season

1,2 Split season during 1931–32 season.

Playoffs

References
American Hockey Association 1926-1942, history and standings

 
1928 establishments in Missouri
1953 disestablishments in Missouri
American Hockey Association (1926–1942) teams
Ice hockey clubs established in 1928
Ice hockey teams in Missouri
Ice hockey clubs disestablished in 1953
Flyers